George Edward Charles Garlick (17 August 1895 – 2 May 1969) was an Australian rules footballer who played with Melbourne and Footscray in the Victorian Football League (VFL). His son, also named George, played for North Melbourne in the 1940s.

Notes

External links 

 

1895 births
1969 deaths
Australian rules footballers from Victoria (Australia)
Melbourne Football Club players
Footscray Football Club (VFA) players
Western Bulldogs players
People from Maryborough, Victoria